Kedar Das is an Indian politician and leader of Communist Party of India. He represented Jamshedpur constituency from 1957 to 1962 and Jamshedpur East constituency from 1969 to 1977. 

Com. Kedar Das was a veteran trade union leader, Ex. MLA of Jamshedpur (three times) . Com. Kedar Das was born on 04/01/1913 at Gurmaha village in Madhubani, Bihar, His father Late Harinandan Lal Das .And Death on 19/02/1981 causing brain hamrage at the time when 10000 casual workers of Tata steel were went on strike under leadership of com. Kedar Das.

References

Communist Party of India politicians from Jharkhand